was a Japanese philosopher and Confucian scholar of the early Edo period, in the Neo-Confucian tradition of Zhu Xi.

Biography
Born in Kyoto as the second of five brothers, Kinoshita was a child prodigy, and studied under Matsunaga Sekigo.

In 1682, the fifth Tokugawa shōgun, Tokugawa Tsunayoshi, appointed him tutor to the court.

A famed educator, Kinoshita's students include Arai Hakuseki (who became advisor to the sixth Tokugawa shōgun,  Tokugawa Ienobu), Amenomori Hōshū, Gion Nankai, Muro Kyūsō, Nishiyama Juntai, and Sakakibara Kōshū.

References
 Zenan Shu  (2009). Cultural and political encounters with Chinese language in early modern Japan : the case of Kinoshita Jun'an (1621-1698), Thesis (D.Phil.), University of Oxford
 Hiroyuki Takeuchi and Hideto Ueno (1991), 木下順庵 / Kinoshita jun'an. Tokyo: Meitoku Shuppansha.
 Arai Hakuseki, Joyce Ackroyd (trans.) (1979), Told Round a Brushwood Fire, University of Tokyo Press.

1621 births
1699 deaths
17th-century Japanese philosophers
17th-century Japanese people
Neo-Confucian scholars